Ettore Messina (born 30 September 1959) is an Italian professional basketball coach who is the head coach of Olimpia Milano of the Italian Lega Basket Serie A (LBA). He has won four EuroLeague championships as a head coach. Messina is regarded as one of the best European basketball coaches of all time, having been named one of the 50 Greatest EuroLeague Contributors in 2008.

He was named the Italian League's Best Coach three times, in the years 1998, 2001, and 2005. Furthermore, he has been named EuroLeague's Coach of the Year twice, in 2006 and 2008. He was inducted into the Italian Basketball Hall of Fame in 2008, and into the Russian VTB United League Hall of Fame, in 2019. Messina also previously worked with the San Antonio Spurs, as an assistant coach for Gregg Popovich, from 2014 to 2019.

Club coaching career

Virtus Bologna
Messina had two different stints (1989–1993 and 1997–2002) as the head coach at the Italian League team, Virtus Bologna. In the 1989–90 season, he won the Italian Cup and also the second-tier level European-wide league, the FIBA Cup Winners' Cup, against Real Madrid, in Florence. He also won the Italian League national championship in 1993. During his second stint at Virtus, he coached the team to win the first-tier level European-wide EuroLeague championship, in both 1997–98 and 2000–01. He also added two Italian League championships to his trophy case in 1998 and 2001, as well as three Italian Cup titles in 1999, 2001, and 2002.

Benetton Treviso
Messina then served as the head coach of the Italian League club Benetton Treviso, where he succeeded Mike D'Antoni as head coach, in 2002. He stayed there for 3 seasons. With Treviso, he won the Italian League championship in 2003, and also the Italian Cup title thrice, adding them to a total streak of 5 consecutive titles, with two different clubs.

CSKA Moscow
Messina then joined the Russian club CSKA Moscow in 2005, and led the team to the EuroLeague's 2005–06 title, and the coveted Triple Crown, in his first season there. On 4 May 2008, CSKA won the EuroLeague championship again under Messina - the club gained its sixth EuroLeague title by downing Maccabi Tel Aviv at the 2007–08 Madrid edition of the EuroLeague Final Four. He resigned from CSKA immediately after leading them to a Russian Championship and the EuroLeague Final, during the 2008–09 season. He was offered a position as the technical director at CSKA, but at the time of his resignation, he had not decided whether or not he wanted to stay with the club.

Real Madrid
Messina was announced as the new head coach of the Spanish League club Real Madrid, on 18 June 2009, and signed his contract with the club the following day. After Real Madrid had several poor performances, Messina resigned from the club's head coach position, in March 2011.

Los Angeles Lakers
Messina was frequently the subject of speculation linking him with vacant coaching jobs in the NBA. For example, he was one of the many coaches in the discussion for the Sacramento Kings head coaching role, and it was also rumored that he would join the Toronto Raptors and San Antonio Spurs coaching staffs. Messina eventually agreed to join the Los Angeles Lakers, as part of head coach Mike Brown's coaching staff, as a full-time consultant to the head coach, for the 2011–12 season.

Return to CSKA Moscow
In June 2012, Messina decided to leave his job as a consultant for the Los Angeles Lakers, and he returned to CSKA Moscow, to become the team's head coach. In June 2014, he parted ways with CSKA Moscow.

San Antonio Spurs
On 15 July 2014, Messina was hired by the San Antonio Spurs, as an assistant coach. On 16 October 2014, Messina would coach the Spurs in a 121–90 preseason win against the Phoenix Suns, due to Gregg Popovich being unable to travel with the team at the time.

Messina would later take on the role of the World Team's head coach in the 2016 NBA Rising Stars Challenge. On 7–8 March 2016, Messina again served as head coach of the Spurs, for two games, due to Gregg Popovich leaving the team for a family emergency. On 19 April 2018, Messina temporarily took over head coaching duties of the team in their playoff series versus the Golden State Warriors, due to Popovich having left the team in light of his wife's death the previous night.

Olimpia Milano
On 11 June 2019, Messina signed a three-year contract, and agreed to become the new head coach and President of Basketball Operations of the Italian club Olimpia Milano.

National team coaching career
From 1993 to 1997 Messina was the head coach of the senior men's Italian national basketball team. He coached Italy at the 1993 EuroBasket and the 1995 EuroBasket, and he also led Italy to the silver medal at the 1997 EuroBasket.

In 2016, Messina took a short leave of absence from the San Antonio Spurs, in order to return as the head coach of the Azzurri, with the goal of qualifying for the 2016 Rio Summer Olympic Game. Messina coached Italy at the 2016 Turin FIBA World Olympic Qualifying Tournament. At the qualification tournament, Italy lost to Croatia, and thus failed to qualify to the 2016 Summer Olympics. He also coached Italy at the 2017 EuroBasket.

Coaching record

|-
| align="left" rowspan=6|Virtus Bologna
| align="left" |1991–92
|19||13||6|||| align="center" |Lost in Quarterfinal Playoffs
|-
| align="left" |1992–93
|16||8||8|||| align="center" |Lost in Quarterfinal Playoffs
|- ! style="background:#FDE910;"
| align="left" |1997–98
|22||19||3|||| align="center" |Won EuroLeague Championship
|- 
| align="left" |1998–99
|23||15||8|||| align="center" |Lost in EuroLeague Finals
|- ! style="background:#FDE910;"
| align="left" |2000–01
|23||20||3||||align="center" |Won EuroLeague Championship
|- 
| align="left" |2001–02
|22||17||5|||| align="center" |Lost in EuroLeague Finals
|- 
| align="left" rowspan=3|Treviso
| align="left" |2002–03
|22||18||4|||| align="center" |Lost in EuroLeague Finals
|- 
| align="left" |2003–04
|20||14||6|||| align="center" |Eliminated at Top 16 Stage
|- 
| align="left" |2004–05
|22||12||10|||| align="center" |Lost in Quarterfinal Playoffs
|-
| align="left" rowspan=5|CSKA Moscow
|- ! style="background:#FDE910;"
| align="left" |2005–06
|24||19||5|||| align="center" |Won EuroLeague Championship
|- 
| align="left" |2006–07
|25||22||3|||| align="center" |Lost in EuroLeague Finals
|- ! style="background:#FDE910;"
| align="left" |2007–08
|25||20||5|||| align="center" |Won Euroleague Championship
|- 
| align="left" |2008–09
|21||16||5|||| align="center" |Lost in EuroLeague Finals
|- 
| align="left" rowspan=2|Real Madrid
| align="left" |2009–10
|20||12||8|||| align="center" |Lost in Quarterfinal Playoffs
|- 
| align="left" |2010–11
|16||11||5|||| align="center" |(resigned)
|- 
| align="left" rowspan=2|CSKA Moscow
| align="left" |2012–13
|26||21||5|||| align="center" |Lost in EuroLeague Semifinals
|- 
| align="left" |2013–14
|31||22||9|||| align="center" |Lost in EuroLeague Semifinals
|- 
| align="left" rowspan=3|AX Armani Exchange Milan
| align="left" |2019-20
|28||12||16|||| align="center" | Season was cancelled due to the Covid-19 Pandemic
|- 
| align="left" |2020-21
|41||25||16|||| align="center" |Lost in EuroLeague Semifinals
|- 
| align="left" |2021-22
| || || || ||
|-class="sortbottom"
| align="center" colspan=2|Career||377||279||98||||

Domestic Leagues

|-
| align="left" |PBC CSKA Moscow
| align="left" |2007–08
|32||31||1||.9688 || align="center"| Won 2008 Russian Super League 1 Finals 
|-
| align="left" |PBC CSKA Moscow
| align="left" |2008–09
|32||30||2||.9375 || align="center"| Won 2009 Russian Super League 1 Finals
|-
| align="left" |Real Madrid
| align="left" |2009–10
|42||31||11||.7381 || align="center"| Lost 2010 Liga ACB Second Round 
|-
| align="left" |Real Madrid
| align="left" |2010–11
|40||29||11||.7250 || align="center"| Lost 2011 Liga ACB Second Round 
|-
| align="left" |PBC CSKA Moscow
| align="left" |2012–13
|31||24||7||.7742 || align="center"| Won 2013 VTB United League Finals
|-
| align="left" |PBC CSKA Moscow
| align="left" |2013–14
|29||24||5||.8276 || align="center"| Won 2014 VTB United League Finals
|-
| align="left" |AX Armani Exchange Olimpia Milan
| align="left" |2019–20
|21||14||7||.7500 || align="center"| League cancelled due to the COVID-19 pandemic
|-
| align="left" |AX Armani Exchange Olimpia Milan
| align="left" |2020–21
|38||28||10||.7368 || align="center"| Lost 2021 Italian League Finals
|-class="sortbottom"
| align="center" colspan=2|Career||265|||213|||52||.8038||

See also
 List of EuroLeague-winning head coaches
 List of foreign NBA coaches

References

External links
Euroleague.net Coaching Profile
Spanish League Coaching Profile 
Italian League Coaching Profile 
50 Greatest EuroLeague Contributors Ettore Messina

1959 births
Living people
EuroLeague-winning coaches
Italian basketball coaches
Italian expatriate basketball people in Russia
Italian expatriate basketball people in Spain
Italian expatriate basketball people in the United States
Italian expatriate sportspeople in Russia
Liga ACB head coaches
FIBA Hall of Fame inductees
Olimpia Milano coaches
Pallacanestro Treviso coaches
PBC CSKA Moscow coaches
Real Madrid basketball coaches
San Antonio Spurs assistant coaches
Virtus Bologna coaches